The economy of Vatican City is supported financially by the sale of stamps, coins, medals, and tourist mementos as well as fees for admission to museums and publication sales. Vatican City employed 4,822 people in 2016.

Vatican City issues its own coins and stamps. It has used the euro as its currency since 1 January 1999, owing to a special agreement with the European Union (council decision 1999/98). Euro coins and notes were introduced on 1 January 2002—the Vatican does not issue euro banknotes. Issuance of euro-denominated coins is strictly limited by treaty, though somewhat more than usual is allowed in a year in which there is a change in the papacy. Because of their rarity, Vatican euro coins are highly sought by collectors.

Key statistics
Budget
revenues: $315 million (2013)
expenditures: $348 million (2013)

Industries

Printing and production of a small amount of mosaics and staff uniforms; worldwide banking and financial activities.

Electricity – production

442 MWh (2010) from solar panels.

Electricity – imports

Electricity supplied by Italy.

Currency

Euro (since 2002). Vatican City depends on Italy for practical production of banknotes, stamps and other valuable titles. Owing to their rarity, Vatican euro coins are sought by collectors.

The fiscal year is the calendar year.

See also
 Secretariat for the Economy
Index of Vatican City-related articles

Notes

References

 
Vatican City